The following is the final results of the 2003 World Wrestling Championships. The Freestyle Competition was held in New York City, United States, while the Greco-Roman Competition was held in Créteil, France.

Medal table

Team ranking

Medal summary

Men's freestyle

Men's Greco-Roman

Women's freestyle

Participating nations

Freestyle
400 competitors from 64 nations participated. 

 (2)
 (5)
 (9)
 (6)
 (5)
 (11)
 (7)
 (11)
 (1)
 (14)
 (12)
 (10)
 (2)
 (3)
 (4)
 (1)
 (2)
 (1)
 (9)
 (7)
 (14)
 (4)
 (14)
 (2)
 (12)
 (10)
 (7)
 (1)
 (4)
 (8)
 (14)
 (10)
 (8)
 (3)
 (1)
 (3)
 (5)
 (8)
 (1)
 (2)
 (2)
 (2)
 (1)
 (2)
 (3)
 (10)
 (6)
 (7)
 (14)
 (7)
 (5)
 (2)
 (10)
 (7)
 (4)
 (7)
 (3)
 (11)
 (2)
 (1)
 (14)
 (14)
 (6)
 (7)

Greco-Roman
283 competitors from 62 nations participated. 

 (1)
 (7)
 (4)
 (4)
 (4)
 (7)
 (1)
 (1)
 (7)
 (2)
 (7)
 (3)
 (3)
 (2)
 (7)
 (6)
 (4)
 (4)
 (5)
 (6)
 (7)
 (7)
 (7)
 (1)
 (7)
 (7)
 (7)
 (7)
 (3)
 (6)
 (4)
 (7)
 (7)
 (7)
 (2)
 (7)
 (1)
 (4)
 (4)
 (5)
 (1)
 (2)
 (7)
 (2)
 (1)
 (5)
 (7)
 (4)
 (2)
 (7)
 (5)
 (6)
 (5)
 (1)
 (1)
 (2)
 (7)
 (1)
 (7)
 (7)
 (6)
 (5)

References
 Freestyle website
 Greco-Roman website
 UWW Database

 
World Wrestling Championships
W
W
Wrestling World Championships
Wrestling World Championships
W
Wrestling in New York (state)
World Wrestling Championships
World Wrestling Championships
World Wrestling Championships